Kavango (before 1998: Okavango) was one of the thirteen regions of Namibia until it was split into the Kavango East and Kavango West Regions in 2013. Its capital was Rundu.

In the north, Kavango bordered the Cuando Cubango Province of Angola, and in the southeast the North-West District of Botswana. Domestically, it bordered the following regions:
Zambezi – east
Otjozondjupa – south
Oshikoto – west
Ohangwena – northwest

Because of its rather higher rainfall than most other parts of Namibia, this region had agricultural potential for the cultivation of a variety of crops, as well as for organised forestry and agro-forestry, which stimulated furniture making and related industries.

Khaudum National Park and Mahango Game Park are located in the region.

Politics
The region was subdivided into nine electoral constituencies: Mpungu, Kahenge, Kapako, Rundu Rural West, Rundu Urban, Rundu Rural East, Mashare, Ndiyona, and Mukwe.

Ambrosius Haingura, a prominent SWAPO organizer during the Namibian War of Independence, served as the region's first Regional Governor from 1993 to 1995. Maurus Nekaro, the Governor of Kavango Region from December 2010, died in office on March 4, 2013. Samuel Mbambo was appointed as Kavango's last Governor in April 2013.

The Fourth Delimitation Commission of Namibia, responsible for recommending on the country's administrative divisions suggested in August 2013 to split the Kavango Region into two. The president Hifikepunye Pohamba enacted the recommendations. As a result, the new Regions of Kavango East and Kavango West have been created.

Population

The region was characterised by an extremely uneven population distribution. The interior is very sparsely inhabited, while the northernmost strip, especially along the Kavango River, has a high population concentration. Largest urban settlements were the capital Rundu and the towns of Nkurenkuru and Divundu.

Economy and infrastructure
Kavango was the region with the highest poverty level in Namibia, more than 50% of the population were classified as poor. According to the 2012 Namibia Labour Force Survey, unemployment in the Kavango Region is 29.8%. Economic activities included farming and tourism. Subsistence fishing also played a role in the nutrition of the people residing near the Kavango River.

Kavango had 323 schools with a total of 77,314 pupils.

Transport

There was a particular dearth of north-south roads in the Region, apart from the Rundu-Grootfontein main road. Rundu has a small airstrip to accommodate medium-sized tourist or cargo aircraft in daylight only. The poor condition of the roads and the long distances had a negative effect on tourism; this situation was improved by the completion of the Trans–Caprivi Highway. A major highway connecting Rundu to western Kavango and the Ohangwena Region is under construction.

Oil exploration
ReconAfrica, a petroleum exploration company headquartered in Canada, has obtained exploration licenses for more than 13,600 square miles of land in Kavango Region of Namibia and in Botswana. In January 2021 ReconAfrica announced the start of drilling operations on the first exploration well. Environmental activists have expressed concern that ReconAfrica’s plans for its test wells have not been properly vetted through Namibia’s environmental review process, however ReconAfrica and both the governments of Namibia and Botswana have stated that the company's activities have followed due process and that no fracking will occur.  ReconAfrica’s drilling area is in the Kavango West region which contains a multicountry conservation park, six locally managed wildlife reserves, and one UNESCO World Heritage site, however the drilling license does not include any of these protected areas.

References

External links 

 Kavango Regional Council

 
States and territories disestablished in 2013